Oxelösund Municipality held a municipal election on 15 September 2002 as part of the local elections. This was held on the same day as the general election.

Results
The number of seats remained at 31 with the Social Democrats winning the most at 15, a drop of five from 1998, losing their overall majority. There were 6,866 valid ballots cast. The Social Democrats remained in power since there was still a sizeable red-green majority (22-9).

Electoral wards
All electoral wards were located within the Oxelösund urban area in a single constituency. For a detailed map of the electoral wards, see the 2010 official results held within the same boundaries.

References

Oxelösund
Oxelösund municipal elections